Richard Rishi is an Indian actor who predominantly appears in Tamil and Telugu films and few Malayalam and Kannada films. He is known for Koottu, A Film by Aravind and his controversial movies with director Mohan G, namely Draupathi and Rudra Thandavam which allegedly propagated casteism and anti-Dalit sentiments.

Production
Despite a relatively high-profile launch through Kadhal Virus, Rishi found it difficult to experience further success in the following years. After that he acted in the Malayalam film called Koottu released in 2004 which gave him a great success and improved his career. Koottu was a great nostalgic film. Films such as Thiru 420 by director duo Sekar Kumar and Sengattuvan, where he starred opposite former Miss India contestant Swetha Vijay, were stalled after production began.

Personal life
Richard studied in Loyola Matriculation. He has two younger sisters, former film actresses Shalini and Shamili. Their father is from Kollam and mother hails from a Malayali family living in Chennai. The sole reason behind his father's shifting to Madras was to become an singer.

Actor Ajith Kumar is his brother-in-law.

Career

Rishi made his acting debut with Jagadeka Veerudu Athiloka Sundari which is released in 1990. He was cast as a child artiste in the Tamil film Anjali in the same year 1990. He first appeared as an adult actor in Kadhal Virus in 2002, playing the lead opposite Sridevi Vijaykumar. The film was released after some delay and fared poorly at the box office.

His next movie was Koottu (2004), which tells the story of two college buddies. The songs were a hit and also this film is a nostalgia in everyone’s mind. In 2005, Girivalam a remake of the Bollywood film Humraaz was released. The movie A Film by Aravind (2005) made him famous. In 2006, the Tamil movie Naalai was released. The same year came another film, Yuga (2006).  Richard had a lesser role to play, and the film  received mixed reviews. Bhagyalakshmi Bumper Draw, a Telugu film was released in 2007. It was the remake of Bollywood film Malamaal Weekly. It also had Rishi playing a side role. Then came the movie Bangaru Konda (2007) with actress Navaneet Kaur. Maharajasri, is another movie for 2007 came and lost at the box office. In 2008, came Veedu Mamoolodu Kadu with Rishi portraying as negative role, then Geetha, a remake of the Hollywood film Phone Booth and Three in which Rishi was reunited with the director Sekhar Suri from A Film by Aravind. In 2009, he acted in Tamil movie Thamizhagam. In 2010, he appeared in Telugu movie Dammunnodu. His next movie Pen Singam (2010) failed at the content of story. In 2011, Uppukandam Brothers Back in Action (2011) was received negative reviews. Then came the movie Endukante... Premanta! (2012) where Rishi was in again in a small side role but the film was a commercial hit. The film Uu Kodathara? Ulikki Padathara? (2012) was a Telugu socio-fantasy with Rishi in a small role.  In 2013, the only film that came was Kannada action-comedy film Benki Birugali, where Rishi was in the lead.

His film Ner Ethir (2014), which was a remake of Across the Hall followed by Ninaithathu Yaaro (2014). Then came Avatharam (2014), with a devotional story. The Telugu film Adavi Kaachina Vennela (2014) was released to positive reviews. In 2015, came the comedy-horror, Maharani Kottai and action film, Adhibar. In 2016, he appeared in Telugu, Srimathi Bangaram followed by three Tamil films Kallattam, Pazhaya Vannarapettai and Andaman. His following films are Dr Chakravarty (2017) and Oollo Pelliki Kukkala Hadavidi (2018). Richard Rishi has joined hands with his 2016's political thriller Pazhaya Vannarapettai director Mohan G, to deliver a revenge drama stained with casteism in Draupadi (2020). The film turns into a drama where message gains preference over storytelling. He appeared alongside Trisha and Nandha in the political thriller film, Paramapadham Vilayattu (2021), portraying David, a goon who tries to strike fear with psychopathic tendencies.

Filmography

References

External links
 

Tamil male actors
Telugu male actors
Living people
Male actors from Chennai
20th-century Indian male actors
21st-century Indian male actors
Male actors in Tamil cinema
Male actors in Telugu cinema
Indian male child actors
Indian male film actors
1977 births